Awaing is a village in Ye Township in the Mon State of south-east Burma. It is located approximately 14 kilometres north-east of Ye city.

Nearby towns and villages include Sonmatha (2.2 nm), Sakale (2.2 nm), Kaleiktok (3.5 nm), Wekwa (3.9 nm), Pawtaw (2.2 nm) and Awagyaik (2.0 nm).

References

Populated places in Mon State